Bresaylor is an unincorporated community in Rural Municipality of Paynton No. 470, Saskatchewan, Canada.  
It is the home of the Bresaylor Heritage Museum, containing artifacts from the area.

The name comes from the surnames of the three Métis founding families, including: the Bremners, the Sayers and the Taylors. They relocated here from Headingley, Manitoba where the three families had become good friends.

See also

 List of communities in Saskatchewan

References 

Paynton No. 470, Saskatchewan
Unincorporated communities in Saskatchewan
Division No. 17, Saskatchewan